Cha-Cha-Cha Boom! is a 1956 American musical film starring Dámaso Pérez Prado, Stephen Dunne, the Mary Kaye Trio, Helen Grayco, Luis Arcaraz and his Orchestra, Lucerto Bárcenas, and Manny López and his Orchestra.  It was produced by Sam Katzman for Columbia Pictures and directed by Fred F. Sears and was their immediate follow-up to Rock Around the Clock (actress Alix Talton appeared in both films). Filming started 14 May 1956.

It was also known as Cha Cha Cha.

Plot
An American record executive (Stephen Dunne) travels to Cuba to find some talent for his record label.

Cast
Stephen Dunne ... 	Bill Haven
Damaso Perez Prado ... Himself
Helen Grayco ... Herself
Mary Kaye ... Herself 
Alix Talton ... Debbie Farmer
Jose Gonzales-Gonzales 	... 	Pedro Fernandez
Sylvia Lewis 	... 	Nita Munay 
Bernie Lowe ... Himself
Dante DiPaolo ... Elvarez
Ruben Rodriguez ... Timbale Player

Soundtrack
Year 'Round Love 
Written by Rose Marie McCoy, and Charles Singleton 
Crazy Crazy
Music by Dámaso Pérez Prado
Mambo No. 8 
Music by Dámaso Pérez Prado
Que Rico El Mambo
Music by Dámaso Pérez Prado
Voodoo Suite
Music by Dámaso Pérez Prado
La niña Popoff 
Written by Dámaso Pérez Prado, Albrecht Marcuse and Aguste G. Schmutz
Cuban Rock and Roll
Music by Dámaso Pérez Prado
El Marinero
Written by Ricardo Rico
The Lonesome Road
Music by Nathaniel Shilkret
Lyrics by Gene Austin
Performed by the Mary Kaye Trio
Get Happy
Music by Harold Arlen
Lyrics by Ted Koehler
Performed by the Mary Kaye Trio
Lilly's Lament 
Written by Frances Maurine Barris, Robert Wells, Jack Allison and Loyce Whiteman
Performed by Helen Grayco
Save Your Sorrow
Lyrics by Buddy G. DeSylva
Music by Al Sherman
Despacho
Diosa
Written by Manny Lopez and Jorge Hernández
Mi musica es para ti
Written by René Touzet
Gelatina
Written by Carlos Molina and Alvaro Escobar
Lucero
Written by Carlos Molina and Alvaro Escobar
Theme from Picnic
Music by George Duning

References

External links

Review of film at Variety

1956 films
Columbia Pictures films
Films set in Cuba
1956 musical films
Films directed by Fred F. Sears
1950s English-language films
American musical films
American black-and-white films